Beneixama photovoltaic power plant is a 20 MW photovoltaic power plant located in Beneixama, Spain.  The plant consists of approximately 100,000 solar panels, encompassing an area of approximately 500,000 m2.  The panels are City Solar PQ 200 modules made of polycrystalline silicon solar cells.
In addition, 200 units of Siemens photovoltaic inverters "Sinvert Solar 100 Master" were installed.

The plant was built by City Solar, and completed in September, 2007.

See also

Photovoltaic power stations

References

External links
City-Solar Group Constructing World's Largest PV Park in Spain
City Solar PQ 200 modules
Live webcam (German)

Photovoltaic power stations in Spain